Smash and grab may refer to:

 Smash and grab, the crime
 Smash and Grab (1937 film), a British film
 Smash & Grab, the 2013 documentary
 Smash and Grab (2019 film), a Pixar short film
 Smash and Grab (Racey album), a 1979 album by Racey
 Smash and Grab Part 1, 2, 3, and 4; four tracks on The Offspring's Americana
 Smash and Grab (biology), a technique used in molecular biology